Piyapong Homkhajohn (born February 14, 1995), simply known as Pong, is a Thai professional footballer who plays as an attacking midfielder for Thai League 3 club Kongkrailas United.

International career

International goals

Under-19

Honours
Ubon UMT United
 Regional League Division 2: 2015

External links
 Buriram opens academy at thaifootball.com
 Profile at siamsport.co.th

1995 births
Living people
Piyapong Homkhajohn
Piyapong Homkhajohn
Association football midfielders
Piyapong Homkhajohn
Piyapong Homkhajohn
Piyapong Homkhajohn
Piyapong Homkhajohn
Piyapong Homkhajohn